King and Queen may refer to:

Music
King & Queen, album by Otis Redding and Carla Thomas
King & Queen (group), a eurobeat group under the A-Beat C label
"King and Queen" (song), a song by Beau Monga

Places
King and Queen County, Virginia
King and Queen Court House, Virginia
Concourse at Landmark Center in Atlanta, Georgia commonly nicknamed as the King and Queen towers

Other uses
King and Queen, Brighton, a pub in Brighton, United Kingdom
King and Queen (sculpture), by Henry Moore
King and Queen (Sorel Etrog sculpture), in Windsor Sculpture Park, Ontario

See also
Kings and Queens (disambiguation)
List of monarchs